The Sioux Lookout Flyers were a junior ice hockey team from Sioux Lookout, Ontario, Canada.  They were a part of the Superior International Junior Hockey League for parts of five seasons.

History

The Sioux Lookout Flyers were added to the Superior International Junior Hockey League for the 2008-09 season.  The Flyers mark the first major level hockey in the town since the Intermediate leagues of the 1970s.

The Flyers are Ontario Junior hockey's most Northerly club at 50° 06′ North.

On September 19, 2008, the Flyers lost their first ever game to the Schreiber Diesels in Schreiber, Ontario by a score of 10-2.  On September 26, the Flyers played their first home game and lost 6-2 to the defending SIJHL champion Dryden Ice Dogs.

On November 12, 2008, sixteen games into a winless season, the ownership of the team pulled the plug on the franchise.  Two days later, the town of Sioux Lookout held a town meeting in regards to the team and elected to save the team as a community with the help of a Winnipeg-based investor.  The team went on hiatus for three games, but returned to action on November 19.

The Flyers won their first ever game on January 2, 2009, defeating the Dryden Ice Dogs, on the road, 5-4 in overtime.  The victory was Sioux Lookout's 30th league game.

On October 3, 2012, the Flyers dropped out of the 2012-13 season after only three games.  The Flyers cited being "unable to continue in a competitive and professional manner for the season" as their reason for withdrawal.  The Flyers claimed it was only going to be a one-year absence to restructure.  In the spring of 2013, the team's official Facebook page reflected that the team was not returning.

Season-by-season results

Playoffs
2009 Lost Quarter-final
Fort Frances Jr. Sabres defeated Sioux Lookout Flyers 3-games-to-none
2010 Lost Semi-final
Third in round robin (0-4) vs. Dryden Ice Dogs and Fort William North Stars
Fort William North Stars defeated Sioux Lookout Flyers 4-games-to-none
2011 Lost Quarter-final
Thunder Bay North Stars defeated Sioux Lookout Flyers 4-games-to-1
2012 Lost Quarter-final
Dryden Ice Dogs defeated Sioux Lookout Flyers 4-games-to-1

References

External links
Sioux Lookout Flyers

Defunct Superior International Junior Hockey League teams
Sioux Lookout
Sport in Northern Ontario
Ice hockey clubs established in 2008
Ice hockey clubs disestablished in 2012
2008 establishments in Ontario
2012 disestablishments in Ontario